Pullambadi is a Panchayat town in Tiruchirappalli district in the Indian state of Tamil Nadu. Pullambadi town panchayat heads the revenue block of Pullambadi in the taluk of Lalgudi.

History
The village of Pullambadi was upgraded into town panchayat during later 19th century.  The name pullambadi was derived from the word "pullinambadi" which means the village of birds.

Demographics
 India census, Pullambadi had a population of 9985. Males constitute 49% of the population and females 51%. Pullambadi has an average literacy rate of 72%, higher than the national average of 59.5%: male literacy is 80%, and female literacy is 65%. In Pullambadi, 10% of the population is under 6 years of age.

Geography
This small town is situated on the Banks of river Nandhiyar which is tribute to River Kollidam.

Attractions
Lord Chidambareswara Temple which is built by Kulothunga Chola I is main attraction. Recent Excavations of inscriptions at Temple reveals many Historical events during Early Chola period. Now the age of temple is around 950 years .

Devi Temple Called Kulunthalamman (Selliamman) Festival During April/May is famous in Tiruchirapalli District after Samayapuram Mariamman Temple.   The festival starts with Muthal kaappu on first Tuesday of "chithirai" Tamil month followed by second kaapu on second Tuesday. Then the 10 days long festival will start.

Education
Government Industrial Training Institute (Women and men)

Schools
 Kalaivani Matriculation school
Government Higher Secondary School
T. E. L. C School
R. C. School
S. R. Matriculation school
 Pari Matriculation school
 Child Jesus Matriculation school
Panchayat union elementary school (west)

Hospitals
Sagayamatha Hospital
Parkavan Hospital
Government Hospital
Sarasvathi Hospital

Economy
Agriculture is the main occupation and Paddy is main crop grown in this region. Pullambadi Canal passes through the town. Pullambadi Canal Scheme Work started during 1956-57. This canal was constructed by Mr.K.Kamaraj Former CM of Tamil Nadu during the 1960s. This was one of the biggest irrigation projects in Tamil Nadu.

Temples

Lord Shiva temple
Kulunthalamman temple
Om Shakthi temple
Mariyamman temple
Old Murugan temple

Gallery

References

Villages in Tiruchirappalli district